Will Jones (born 12 March 1998) is a Welsh rugby union player who plays for Ospreys as a flanker. He is a Wales under-20 international.

Jones competed at the 2015 European Cadet Judo Championships.

Jones made his debut for the Ospreys in 2016 having previously played for the Ospreys academy and Swansea RFC.

References

External links 
Ospreys Player Profile 

1998 births
Living people
Ospreys (rugby union) players
People from the Gower Peninsula
Rugby union players from Swansea
Welsh rugby union players
Rugby union flankers